Nidaa Tounes (usually translated as "Call of Tunisia", "Call for Tunisia", or "Tunisia's Call") is a big tent secularist political party in Tunisia. After being founded in 2012, the party won a plurality of seats in the October 2014 parliamentary election. The party's founding leader Beji Caid Essebsi was elected President of Tunisia in the 2014 presidential election.

History

Foundation
The party's foundation was announced when former prime minister Beji Caid Essebsi on 20 April 2012 launched his Call for Tunisia as a response to post-revolutionary "instances of disturbing extremism and violence that threaten public and individual liberties, as well as the security of the citizens". It was officially founded on 16 June 2012 and describes itself as a "modernist" and "social-democratic" party of the moderate left. However, it also includes notable economically liberal currents.

The party has patched together former members of ousted president Ben Ali's Constitutional Democratic Rally, secular leftists, progressive liberals and Destourians (followers of Tunisia's "founder" Habib Bourguiba). In addition, the party has the support of many members of the Tunisian General Labour Union (UGTT) and the national employers' union, UTICA. They believe that Tunisia's secular forces have to unite to counter the dominance of the Islamist Ennahda Movement.

From its foundation until July 2013, 11 members of the Constituent Assembly joined the party by defecting from various other parties.

Union for Tunisia
On 11 February 2013, the Republican Party joined Nidaa Tounes and four other parties in a political alliance called Union for Tunisia (UPT). Moreover, it participated in the formation of the broad oppositional National Salvation Front in July 2013. However, ahead of the October 2014 legislative election, Nidaa Tounes decided to run its own lists and not to contest the election as part of the UPT.

2014 to present
The party has seen tensions between supporters of Essebsi's son, Hafedh Essebsi, and others.  Former member Mohsen Marzouk went on to create a party named Machrouu Tounes while  prime minister Youssef Chahed formed a new party named Tahya Tounes.

Prominent members
Beji Caid Essebsi, former president of the party, former prime minister of the 2011 post-revolution transitional government, former minister under Habib Bourguiba
Taïeb Baccouche, the party's secretary-general, former secretary-general of the Tunisian General Labour Union, former president of the Arab Institute of Human Rights, minister of education in the post-revolution transitional government led by Essebsi (2011)
Faouzi Elloumi, a wealthy businessman and member of the executive committee
Mohsen Marzouk, member of the executive committee charged with external relations
Mahmoud Ben Rhomdane, one of the party's chief economic advisors
Lazhar Karoui Chebbi, former minister of Justice in Essebsi's cabinet (2011)
Boujemaa Remili, former leader of the Tunisian Communist Party
Wafa Makhlouf Sayadi, head of the Center for Young Corporate Leaders (CJD)
Ridha Belhaj, one of the party founders, actual Chief of Staff of the Tunisian presidency and former Chief Cabinet Secretary in Beji Caid Essebsi's 2011 post-revolution transitional government.

Election results

References

External links
 

2012 establishments in Tunisia
Centrist parties in Tunisia
Destourian parties
Liberal parties in Tunisia
Political parties established in 2012
Political parties in Tunisia
Secularism in Tunisia
Social democratic parties in Tunisia